Sri Lanka national football team results from 2010 are as follows:

2010

2011

2012

2013

2014

2015

2016

2018

2019

2020

2021

2022

References

2010
2010s in Sri Lankan sport
2020s in Sri Lankan sport